The office of High Sheriff of Dyfed was established in 1974 as part of the creation of the county of Dyfed in Wales following the Local Government Act 1972, and effectively replaced the shrievalties of the amalgamated counties of Cardiganshire, Carmarthenshire and Pembrokeshire. Since 1996 Dyfed has a purely ceremonial meaning, having been broken up for administrative purposes.

High Sheriffs of Dyfed
 1974: Colonel John Anthony Sulivan, of Benton Castle, Milford Haven.
 1975: Dr. David Brynmor Llewellyn-Morgan, of 1 Pare Howard Avenue, Llanelli.
 1976: Thomas Arfon Owen, of Bryn-Derw, Llanbadarn Fawr, Aberystwyth.
 1977: Christopher Harold Pemberton, Esq., of Vaynor, Narberth.
 1978: Lieut.-Colonel Gilbert Henry Fleetwood Chaldecott, of Vrynylan, Nantgaredig.
 1979: Doctor William Joseph St. Ervyl-Glyndwr Rhys, of Plas Bronmeurig, Ystrad Meurig.
 1980: Colonel William Peter Howells, OBE., T.D., of White Gates, Little Haven, Haverfordwest
 1981: William James Hinds, MBE, of Danyrallt, Abergorlech Road, Carmarthen.
 1982: Hywel Heulyn Roberts of Synod, Llandysul
 1983: David Owen John Shoubridge Lorth-Phillips, of Knowles Farm, Lawrenny, Kilgetty.
 1984: Joseph David Dyfrig Williams, of Penllwyn Park, Carmarthen.
 1985: Dr John Hedley Cule, of Abereinon, Capel Dewi, Llandysul
 1986: Thomas Charles Hughes, Esq., of First Point, North Cliff, Tenby.
 1987: The Hon. Robin William Lewis, of Orchard House, Llanstephan.
 1988: Griffith Berwyn Williams, MBE., of 14 Pendre, Cardigan.
 1989: Paul John Kaye Speyer of Hill, Narberth 
 1990: Dr. John Henry Thomas Rees, of Kings Park, St. Clears.
 1991: Sir Geraint Llewellyn Evans, Kt., CBE., of Trelawney, Aberaeron.
 1992: George Malcolm Green, of Delapoer Lodge, Dale Road, Haverfordwest.
 1993: Mrs. Patrick Rooney
 1994: Dr J. Geraint Jenkins
 1995: Ieuan Wyn Jones
 1996: David Clive Jones-Davies OBE, of Principal's Residence, Trinity College, Carmarthen.
 1997: Commander Huw Ceiriog Lloyd-Williams, RN (Retd), Plas Trefilan, Llanbedr P.S., Ceredigion.
 1998: John Seymour Allen-Mirehouse, Esq., The Hall, Angle, near Pembroke.
 1999: J.P.G. Andrews
 2000: Daniel Gruffydd Jones
 2001: Richard Harold James, of Clarbeston Road, Pembrokeshire
 2002: Stephen Patrick Rees of Llanelli.
 2003: Evan Keith John Evans of Deganwy, Sunny Hill, Llandysul.
 2004: Mrs Norma Beryl Drew of Cwm-Pibau, New Moat, Clarbeston Road, Haverfordwest.
 2005: John David Alan Thomas
 2006: Dr Ann Rhys
 2007: Colonel David Llewellin Davies, MBE. TD
 2008: Claire Mary Mansel Lewis of Llandeilo
 2009: Gareth Rowlands of Dôl-y-bont
 2010: David Llewellyn Pryse Lloyd of Narberth
 2011: Thomas O S Lloyd of Dryslwyn
 2012: Elan Closs Stephens CBE, of Aberystwyth
 2013: J T Davies of Crymych 
 2014: Mrs Rachel Elinor Jones of  Bethlehem, Llangadog
 2015: James Wilfrid Poyer Lewis of Llanddewi Velfrey, Narberth, Pembrokeshire
 2016: Professor Medwin Hughes of Carmarthen
 2017: Mrs Susan Carol Balsom of Aberystwyth, Ceredigion 
 2018: Stephen Mansel Edward Davies of Llanfrynach
 2019: Mrs Anne Helena Jane Lewis of Sir Gar, Carmarthenshire  
 2020: Mrs Sharron Kim Lusher of Saundersfoot, Pembrokeshire 
 2021: Jonathan Thomas Gravell of Cydweli
 2022: David Rowland Rees-Evans of Ceredigion
 2023: Maurig David Raymond, CBE

See also
 High Sheriff of Cardiganshire
 High Sheriff of Carmarthenshire
 High Sheriff of Pembrokeshire

References

Dyfed